Bad Johnson is a 2014 American sex comedy film directed by Huck Botko.

Plot
Rich is a sex addict who ruins every relationship through infidelity. He wishes that his penis would leave him alone. He wakes up one day to find his penis has taken on human form.

Cast
 Cam Gigandet as Rich Johnson
 Nick Thune as Rich's Penis
 Katherine Cunningham as Lindsay Young
 Kevin Miller as Josh Nelson
 Jamie Chung as Jamie

Reception
The film holds a 29% on Rotten Tomatoes.

References

External links
 
 

 
 

2010s fantasy comedy films
2014 romantic comedy films
2010s sex comedy films
2014 films
American fantasy comedy films
American romantic comedy films
American sex comedy films
2010s English-language films
Films about sex addiction
Films set in Chicago
Films shot in Chicago
Films directed by Huck Botko
2010s American films